A phaeton (also phaéton) was a form of sporty open carriage popular in the late eighteenth and early nineteenth century.  Drawn by one or two horses, a phaeton typically featured a minimal very lightly sprung body atop four extravagantly large wheels.  With open seating, it was both fast and dangerous, giving rise to its name, drawn from the mythical Phaëthon, son of Helios, who nearly set the Earth on fire while attempting to drive the chariot of the Sun.

With the advent of the automobile, the term was adopted to refer to open touring cars, which were in consequence referred to as phaeton-bodied.

Types

The most impressive but dangerous phaeton was the four-wheeled 'high-flyer', the body of which consisted of a light seat perched above two sets of springs. It was from one of these that the rising poet Thomas Warwick was thrown to his death near the fashionable town of Bath during the 1780s. There was also the heavier mail phaeton used chiefly to carry passengers with luggage and named for its construction, using "mail" springs originally designed for use on mail coaches. The spider phaeton, of American origin and made for gentlemen drivers, was a high and lightly constructed carriage with a covered seat in front and a footman's seat behind. Fashionable phaetons used at horse shows included the Stanhope, typically having a high seat and closed back, and the Tilbury, a two-wheeled carriage with an elaborate spring suspension system, with or without a top. A variation of this type of a carriage is called a Victoria, with a retractable cover over the rear passenger compartment.

Use

Queen Victoria was particularly associated with the phaeton and there are prints and photos of her driving in them both before and throughout her reign. Its openness put her in danger and there were assassination attempts made on her life while in one by Edward Oxford in 1840 and by Henry Holford  in 1846. In her later years she enjoyed travelling in a phaeton drawn by a single donkey or mule, and there are examples of this type in the Royal Collection. 

Another was put to use by Queen Elizabeth II each June from 1978 to 2011 during the official Queen's Birthday celebrations,  when she traveled to and from Trooping the Colour on Horse Guards Parade in an ivory-mounted phaeton carriage made in 1842 for her great-great-grandmother, Queen Victoria.

A social statement of a different kind was made during the 1880s by Valerie, Lady Meux, who defied London Society by driving herself in a high phaeton drawn by zebras. Yet another was the use of such carriages by revolutionaries to carry out the 1907 Tiflis bank robbery.

Gallery

See also
 Carriage
 Volkswagen Phaeton

References

External links

 MNC - Spider Phaeton. Museu Nacional dos Coches (National Coach Museum), Lisbon, Portugal

Carriages